Kolkur is a village in Sadasivpet Mandal, formerly in Medak district of Telangana State, India. As part of Telangana Districts' re-organisation, Kolkur village in Sadasivpet Mandal was reorganised from Medak District to Sangareddy district. It is located 15 km towards the west of the District headquarters Sangareddi and 8 km from Sadasivapet municipality.
Kolkur village of Medak has a substantial population of Schedule Caste. Schedule Caste (SC) constitutes 27.81% while Schedule Tribe (ST) were 1.84% of total population in Kolkur village. In Kolkur village out of the total population, 1105 are engaged in work activities. 98.28% of workers describe their work as Main Work (Employment or Earning more than 6 Months) while 1.72% are involved in Marginal activity providing a livelihood for less than 6 months. Of 1105 workers engaged in Main Work, 209 were cultivators (owner or co-owner) while 676 were agricultural labourers.

High-Density State

The Kolkur Postcode is 502291 and its postal head office is Sadasivpet.

Nizampur (2 km), Pottipally (3 km), Kodur (3 km), Minpur (4 km), Pulkal (6 km) are the nearby Villages to Kolkur. Kolkur is surrounded by Sadasivpet Mandal to the west, Munpalle Mandal to the west, Andole Mandal to the North, Kondapur Mandal to the South.

Sadasivpet, Sangareddy, Singapur, Zahirabad are the nearby Cities to Kolkur.	

This Place is in the border of the Medak District and Rangareddi District. Rangareddi District Mominpet is South towards this place.
Kolkur 2011 Census Details
Kolkur Local Language is Telugu. Kolkur Village Total population is 2114 and number of houses are 492. Female Population is 50.4%. Village literacy rate is 53.7% and the Female Literacy rate is 20.7%.

Demographics
Census Parameter	Census Data
Total Population	2114
Total No of Houses	492
Female Population % 50.4% ( 1065)
Total Literacy rate % 53.7% ( 1135)
Female Literacy rate 20.7% ( 437)
Scheduled Tribes Population % 1.8% ( 39)
Scheduled Caste Population % 27.8% ( 588)
Working Population % 52.3%
Child(0 -6) Population by 2011	178
Girl Child(0 -6) Population % by 2011 55.1% ( 98)

Politics in Kolkur
TDP, TRS, BJP, INC are the major political parties in this area. 
Polling Stations /Booths near Kolkur
1)Kashipur 
2)Kolkoor 
3)Nandikandi 
4)Nijampur 
5)Nizampur

Assembly constituency: Sangareddy assembly constituency 
Assembly MLA:  
Lok Sabha constituency: Medak parliamentary constituency 
Parliament MP:

Education

Schools in Kolkur
Govt. High School Kolkur
Address : GHS KOLKUR beside Bhiraling mandira, Kudi Darga road Kolkur
Sri Swami Vivekananda School Kolkur

Zphs Kolkur
Address : kolkur, sadasivapet, Medak, Andhra Pradesh . PIN- 502291, Post - Sadasivpet

Transport

Kolkur is served by a number of buses.

Climate

References

Villages in Sangareddy district